Michaël Llodra and Fabrice Santoro were the defending champions, and won the final 7–6(4), 6–3 against Bob and Mike Bryan.

Seeds

Draw

Finals

Top half

Section 1

Section 2

Bottom half

Section 3

Section 4

External links
 2004 Australian Open – Men's draws and results at the International Tennis Federation
 Draw

Men's Doubles
Australian Open (tennis) by year – Men's doubles